Jetfighter V: Homeland Protector is a combat flight simulator video game developed by Polish studio Interactive Vision and published by Global Star Software in 2003.

Development
The game was first announced on July 9, 2003.

Reception

References

2003 video games
Combat flight simulators
Video games developed in Poland
Windows games
Windows-only games
Global Star Software games